Roger Taillibert (21 January 1926 – 3 October 2019) was a French architect, active as a designer from about 1963 to 1987.

Taillibert was notable for designing the Parc des Princes in Paris and the Olympic Stadium in Montreal, Quebec, Canada.

Biography 
Taillibert was born in Châtres-sur-Cher.  He was honored by the French government as commander of the Légion d'Honneur, commander of the Ordre National du Mérite, commander of the Ordre des Palmes Académiques and commander of the Ordre des Arts et des Lettres.

Portfolio

 Pôle sportif et culturel Chamonix Nord
 Parc des Princes in Paris
 Stadium Lille-Metropole in Lille
 Olympic Stadium in Montreal, Quebec, Canada
 Olympic Velodrome, Montreal (now called the Montreal Biodome)
 Olympic Pool (Montreal)
 ASPIRE Academy, Qatar
 Armed Forces Officer's Club and Hotel, Abu Dhabi, UAE
 Luxembourg's National Sports and Culture Centre d'Coque, better known simply as d'Coque

References

External links 

 Taillibert International website
 Académie des Beaux-Arts (in French)
 Structurae: Roger Taillibert

Multimedia
 CBC Archives A clip from 1975 where Roger Taillibert talks about his designs for the Montreal Olympic stadium.
 CBC Archives - A look back on legacy of the problem plagued Montreal Olympic Stadium (1999).
 CBC Archives Roger showing his tower to reporters (end of clip).

20th-century French architects
1926 births
2019 deaths
People from Loir-et-Cher
École des Beaux-Arts alumni
Members of the Académie des beaux-arts
Commandeurs of the Légion d'honneur
Commanders of the Ordre national du Mérite
Commandeurs of the Ordre des Palmes Académiques
Commandeurs of the Ordre des Arts et des Lettres